Eljan Mehmetaj (born 8 September 2001) is an Albanian professional footballer who most recently played as a defender for Albanian club Bylis Ballsh.

Club career

Early career

Bylis Ballsh

International career

Career statistics

Club

References

External links

2001 births
Living people
Sportspeople from Fier
Albanian footballers
Association football defenders
Kategoria e Parë players
KF Bylis Ballsh players
Albania youth international footballers